Processional giants are costumed figures in European folklore, particularly present in Belgian, French, Portuguese, Spanish, and English folkloric processions. The main feature of these figures is typically their papier maché head, whilst bodies are covered in clothing matching the costume's theme.

Since 2008, Belgian and French processional giants have been recognised as a Masterpiece of the Oral and Intangible Heritage of Humanity by UNESCO, as part of the binational listing of 'Processional giants and dragons in Belgium and France'.

Background
The processional giant is a gigantic costumed figure that represents a fictitious or real being. Inherited from medieval rites, tradition has it that it is carried, and that it dances in the streets during processions or festivals. Its physiognomy and size are variable, and its name-giving varies according to the regions; among the Flemings, it is known by the name of reuze, among the Picards it is called gayant. The large biblical figures in the procession also served the purpose of catechising a largely illiterate population.

The first registered date for the gigantones e cabeçudos is the Corpus Christi festivity in Évora, Portugal, back in 1265. It included the snake, the demon and the dragon which represented the challenges that Jesus Christ had to defeat. In Spain, the first written references in novels date from 1276 in Pamplona (Navarra) with three giants representing three people from Pamplona: Pero-Suciales (woodcutter), Mari-Suciales (villager) and Jucef-Lacurari (Jew).

Belgium
Belgium has nearly 1500 giants on its soil. Their appearance dates back to the 15th century; Goliath of Nivelles, which is mentioned as early as 1457, is the oldest known Belgian giant. Belgium also has the largest giant in Europe; Jean Turpin of Nieuwpoort, which exceeds .

The Belgian cultural heritage includes the following events:
 Ducasse d'Ath
 Ducasse de Mons
 Meyboom of Brussels
 Ommegang van Dendermonde
 Ommegang van Mechelen

France
The giant is one of the symbols of the Nord-Pas-de-Calais region. It is the object of ancestral cultural practices that are still kept alive. Present at regional festivals and events, he represents the northern community.

The region currently has more than 450 giants, spread over the whole territory. There are nevertheless more dynamic intra-regional zones, located around central points. The Flemish part of the region is a land of giants; each city has one or more of them. Examples include Reuze Papa and Reuze Maman of Cassel, Tisje Tasje of Hazebrouck, Jean de Bûcheron and La Belle Hélène in Steenvoorde, and Totor of Steenwerck. In the South, in the Languedoc region, there is the Pézenas colt, and in the Provence, the tarasque of Tarascon (Bouches-du-Rhône).

 Cassel: Reuze Papa and Reuze Maman
 Douai: Gayant, Marie Cagenon, Fillon, Jacquot, Binbin
 Pézenas: le Poulain
 Tarascon: la Tarasque

Spain

Gigantes

The giants are usually hollow figures several meters tall, with a painted paper maché head and arms, the rest of the body being covered in cloth and other clothing. Their frame is usually made of wood or aluminium, with carton-pierre—a mixture of papier-mâché and plaster of paris—used to make the head and hands. The frame of the body is hidden by cloth, and the arms typically have no structural element to allow them to swing in the air when the giant is turned.

Within the frame is an individual controlling the giant. He carries a harness on his shoulder that is linked to the internal structure, and will move and shake the giant in a dance, usually accompanied by a local marching band. Typically, these dances will include at least two giants, the male gigante and the female giantess, called giganta or gigantona, though some towns have multiple couples.

The figures usually depict archetypes of the town, such as the bourgeois and the peasant woman, or historical figures of local relevance, such as a founding king and queen, or pairs of Moorish and Christian nobles.

Cabezudos
Cabezudos are smaller figures, usually to the human scale, that feature an oversized, carton-pierre head. The heads are worn with a matching costume. The person dressed as cabezudo will use one hand to hold his head, while the other hand carries a whip or pig bladder, used to frighten children or young women. Seeing through the "mouth" of the head, he will chase after these people, though he might pause to calm a frightened child.

As with the giants, the cabezudos typically represent archetypes of their town.

Zarzuela
Gigantes y cabezudos is also the title of an 1898 zarzuela, with music by Manuel Fernández Caballero, set in Saragossa and featuring a contemporary event: the Spanish army's return from the disastrous defeat of the Cuban War of Independence. The action unfolds during the festival of the Fiestas del Pilar, and concludes with a rousing jota focusing on the stereotypically strong, hardy character of the Aragonese, comparing them to the ever-battling "Gigantes" and "Cabezudos".

England

England's most famous gianteering tradition is arguably that of the Jack in the Green, however the country is also host to giants more visually similar to those of continental Europe. These giants may represent figures of folklore and pseudohistory, or can be more general personifications. The earliest record of a processional giant in England is a reference from 1570 to the Salisbury Giant who processed on the eve of St John the Baptist's Day, or Midsummer's Day. The Salisbury Giant, a depiction of Saint Christopher, is believed by some to date to the 1400s, and was owned by the Tailor's Guild before being purchased by the Salisbury Museum in 1873. St Agnes, Cornwall,  hosts the May festival Bolster Day featuring a processional giant that represents the mythical giant Bolster. Other English giants include Nathandriel, The Morrigan, War and Peace, Hannah Clarke, Gog and Magog, and Mr Fishy.

Philippines
The Higantes Festival is held in Angono, Rizal between 22 and 23 November since the late 19th century.

Other figures
 Celedón
 Hobby horse
 Joaldun
 Judas Iscariot
 Olentzero
 Toro de fuego
 Zanpantzar

See also
 Processional giants and dragons in Belgium and France
 Giant puppet

References

Footnotes

Notes

External links

 Giants and big heads group in San Sebastian
 Madrid's group
 Valladolid's group - Giants and big heads
 International Circle of Friends of Giant Puppets
 Giants of Lleida Friends Assotiation
 Gigantes y cabezudos of Zaragoza

European folklore
Puppets
Spanish culture
Catalan culture
Basque culture
Portuguese culture